John Comstock Doyle is the John G Braun Professor of Control and Dynamical Systems, Electrical Engineering, and BioEngineering at the California Institute of Technology. He is known for his work in control theory and his current research interests are in theoretical foundations for complex networks in engineering, biology, and multiscale physics.

Education
He earned a B.S. and an M.S. in electrical engineering from the Massachusetts Institute of Technology in 1977 and a Ph.D. in Mathematics from the University of California, Berkeley in 1984 with his thesis titled Matrix interpolation theory and optimal control.

Work
Doyle's early work was in the mathematics of robust control, linear-quadratic-Gaussian control robustness, (structured) singular value analysis, and H-infinity methods. He has co-authored books and software toolboxes, and a control analysis tool for high performance commercial and military aerospace systems, as well as other industrial systems.

Awards
Doyle earned the IEEE W.R.G. Baker Prize Paper Award (1991), the IEEE Automatic Control Transactions Axelby Award twice, and the AACC Schuck award. He also has been awarded the AACC Donald P. Eckman Award, the 2004 IEEE Control Systems Award and the Centennial Outstanding Young Engineer Award.

References

External links
John C. Doyle's homepage
Discover Magazine article

California Institute of Technology faculty
Control theorists
UC Berkeley College of Letters and Science alumni
MIT School of Engineering alumni
Living people
Year of birth missing (living people)